St. Anthony Messenger is a national Roman Catholic family magazine published by the Franciscan Friars (O.F.M.) of St. John the Baptist Province, Cincinnati, Ohio in the United States, with the explicit ecclesiastical approval of the Archbishop of Cincinnati.

History 
The first issue of the magazine was published by the Franciscans on June 1, 1893. Over the decades it grew into one of the principal Catholic family magazines in the United States. 

In recent decades, in the wake of the Second Vatican Council, the magazine expanded into Franciscan Media, which has become one of the country's largest publishers of popular, inspirational, and educational Roman Catholic spirituality resources. 

The magazine has featured interviews with and articles about prominent Catholics, and includes educational, inspirational, and informative articles and columns each month. 

Two of its longest-lived and popular regular features are Pete and Repeat and Ask a Franciscan.

See also
The Catholic Telegraph

External links

Catholic magazines published in the United States